Araucaria (original pronunciation: [a.ɾawˈka. ɾja]) is a genus of evergreen coniferous trees in the family Araucariaceae. There are 20 extant species in New Caledonia (where 14 species are endemic, see New Caledonian Araucaria), Norfolk Island, eastern Australia, New Guinea, East Argentina, South Brazil, Chile and Paraguay. They are still common in the South Pacific region and Eastern Australia.

Description

The horizontal, spreading branches grow in whorls and are covered with leathery or needle-like leaves. In some species, the leaves are narrow, awl-shaped and lanceolate, barely overlapping each other; in others they are broad and flat, and overlap broadly.

The trees are mostly dioecious, with male and female cones found on separate trees, though occasional individuals are monoecious or change sex with time. The female cones, usually high on the top of the tree, are globose, and vary in size among species from  diameter. They contain 80–200 large edible seeds, similar to pine nuts, though larger.

The genus is familiar to many people as the genus of the distinctive Chilean pine or monkey-puzzle tree (Araucaria araucana). The genus is named after the Spanish exonym Araucano ("from Arauco") applied to the Mapuche of south-central Chile and south-west Argentina, whose territory incorporates natural stands of this genus. The Mapuche people call it , and consider it sacred. Some Mapuche living in the Andes name themselves Pehuenche ("people of the ") as they traditionally harvested the seeds extensively for food.

No distinct vernacular name exists for the genus. Many are called "pine", although they are only distantly related to true pines, in the genus Pinus.

Distribution and paleoecology

Members of Araucaria are found in Argentina, Brazil, New Caledonia, Norfolk Island, Australia, New Guinea, Chile and Papua (Indonesia). Many if not all current populations are relicts, and of restricted distribution. They are found in forest and maquis shrubland, with an affinity for exposed sites. The earliest records of the genus date to the Middle Jurassic, represented by Araucaria mirabilis of Argentina. Fossil records show that the genus also formerly occurred in the northern hemisphere until the end of the Cretaceous period.

By far the greatest diversity exists in New Caledonia, likely due to a relatively recent adaptive radiation, as all New Caledonian species are more closely related to each other than they are to other Araucaria. Much of New Caledonia is composed of ultramafic rock with serpentine soils, with low levels of nutrients, but high levels of metals such as nickel. Consequently, its endemic Araucaria species are adapted to these conditions, and many species have been severely affected by nickel mining in New Caledonia and are now considered threatened or endangered, due to their habitat lying in prime areas for nickel mining activities.

Some evidence suggests that the long necks of sauropod dinosaurs may have evolved specifically to browse the foliage of tall trees, including those of Araucaria. An analysis of modern Araucaria leaves found that they have a high energy content but are slow fermenting, making their ancestors a likely attractive target.

Classification and species list

There are four extant sections and two extinct sections in the genus, sometimes treated as separate genera.

Extant Species

Genetic studies

Genetic studies indicate that the extant members of the genus can be subdivided into two large clades – the first consisting of the sections Araucaria, Bunya, and Intermedia; and the second of the strongly monophyletic section Eutacta. Sections Eutacta and Bunya are both the oldest taxa of the genus, with Eutacta possibly older.
  Section Araucaria.   Leaves broad; cones more than  diameter; seed germination hypogeal. Syn. sect. Columbea; sometimes includes Intermedia and Bunya
 Araucaria angustifolia – Paraná pine (obsolete: Brazilian pine, candelabra tree); southern and southeastern Brazil, northeastern Argentina.
 Araucaria araucana – monkey-puzzle or pehuén (obsolete: Chile pine); central Chile & western Argentina.
 Araucaria nipponensis – Japan and Sakhalin (Upper Cretaceous)
   Section Bunya.  Contains only one living species. Produces recalcitrant seeds with hypogeal (cryptocotylar) germination, though extinct species may have exhibited epigeal germination.
 Araucaria bidwillii – bunya-bunya; Eastern Australia
   Section Intermedia.  Contains only one living species. Produces recalcitrant seeds
 Araucaria hunsteinii – klinki; New Guinea
 Araucaria haastii - New Zealand (Cretaceous)
 Section Eutacta.  Leaves narrow, awl-like; cones less than  diameter; seed germination epigeal
 Araucaria bernieri – New Caledonia
 Araucaria biramulata – New Caledonia
 Araucaria columnaris – Cook pine; New Caledonia
 Araucaria cunninghamii – Moreton Bay pine, hoop pine; Eastern Australia, New Guinea
 Araucaria goroensis – New Caledonia
 Araucaria heterophylla – Norfolk Island pine; Norfolk Island
 Araucaria humboldtensis – New Caledonia
 Araucaria laubenfelsii – New Caledonia
 Araucaria luxurians – New Caledonia
 Araucaria montana – New Caledonia
 Araucaria muelleri – New Caledonia
 Araucaria nemorosa – New Caledonia
 Araucaria rulei – New Caledonia
 Araucaria schmidii – New Caledonia
 Araucaria scopulorum – New Caledonia
 Araucaria subulata – New Caledonia
 Araucaria lignitici – (Paleogene) Yallourn, Victoria, Australia 
Araucaria famii – (Late Cretaceous) Vancouver Island, Canada.
 Section Yezonia. Extinct. Contains only one species
 Araucaria vulgaris – Japan (Late Cretaceous)
 Section Perpendicula. Extinct. Contains only one species
 Araucaria desmondii - New Zealand (Late Cretaceous)
 incertae sedis
 Araucaria beipiaoensis – Tiaojishan Formation, China (Middle Jurassic)
 Araucaria fibrosa – López de Bertodano Formation, Antarctica (Late Cretaceous)
 Araucaria marensii – La Meseta Formation, Antarctica & Santa Cruz Formation, Argentina
 Araucaria nihongii – Upper Yezo Group, Japan (Late Cretaceous)
 Araucaria taieriensis - New Zealand (Late Cretaceous)
Araucaria brownii  - England (Middle Jurassic)
 Araucaria mirabilis – Patagonia (Middle Jurassic)
 Araucaria sphaerocarpa - England (Middle Jurassic)
Araucaria bindrabunensis (previously classified under section Bunya) has been transferred to the genus Araucarites.

Uses

Some of the species are relatively common in cultivation because of their distinctive, formal symmetrical growth habit. Several species are economically important for timber production.

Food

The edible large seeds of A. araucana, A. angustifolia and A. bidwillii — also known as Araucaria nuts, and often called, although improperly, pine nuts — are eaten as food, particularly among the Mapuche people of Chile and southwest Argentina and among Native Australians.
In South America Araucaria nuts or seeds are called piñas, pinhas, piñones or pinhões, like pine nuts in Europe.

Pharmacological activity
Pharmacological reports on genus Araucaria are anti-ulcer, antiviral, neuro-protective, anti-depressant and anti-coagulant.

See also
 Agathis (kauri)
 Wollemia

References

External links

 
 

 
Dioecious plants
Extant Triassic first appearances
Conifer genera